Daniel Allen Cox (born February 3, 1976) is a Canadian author. Cox's novels Shuck and Krakow Melt were both finalists for the Lambda Literary Award and the ReLit Award.

Life and career
Cox was born in Montreal, Quebec, Canada, where he was raised a Jehovah's Witness. His novella Tattoo This Madness In, about a young Jehovah’s Witness who uses Smurf tattoos to rebel against his faith, was nominated for an Expozine Alternative Press Award.

Shuck, his debut novel about a New York City hustler, was a Lambda Literary Award and a ReLit Award finalist. Cox’s second novel Krakow Melt was excerpted in The Advocate, nominated for the Ferro-Grumley Award, and named to the American Library Association’s Over the Rainbow List. The novel formed the basis of three essays in the debut issue of The Word Hoard, academic journal of the Department of English and Writing Studies at Western University.

The author’s third and fourth novels, Basement of Wolves and Mouthquake, were also published by Arsenal Pulp Press. An excerpt of Mouthquake was translated for Nova Istra literary journal as the first queer text to be published in the Chakavian dialect of Croatian, as well as the first text to introduce the personage of Antonio Barichievich, Croatian-Canadian strongman, to a Croatian literary audience. Cox read the entire novel out loud at a durational performance, the last event held at RATS9 gallery in Montreal.

Cox has appeared at Ottawa International Writers Festival, Blue Metropolis Montréal International Literary Festival, Winnipeg International Writers Festival, GritLit Festival, Westfest, and the Atlanta Queer Literary Festival, as well as on CBC Radio One and Airelibre TV. He co-wrote the screenplay for the Bruce LaBruce film Gerontophilia, and is a former columnist for Xtra! and former president of the Quebec Writers' Federation.

His essays and short stories have been published in several anthologies and literary journals, including Electric Literature, Literary Hub, Catapult, The Florida Review, The Rumpus, Fourth Genre, Maisonneuve, Open Book Toronto, and filling Station. His essay "The Glow of Electrum", published in The Malahat Review, was named Notable in Best American Essays 2021 and was a finalist for a Canadian National Magazine Award in Personal Journalism. Cox was a juror for the 2021 Dayne Ogilvie Prize presented by Writers' Trust of Canada.

Cox's memoir-in-essays I Felt the End Before It Came: Memoirs of a Queer Ex-Jehovah's Witness is forthcoming from Penguin Random House in May 2023.

Bibliography
Tattoo This Madness In (novella, Dusty Owl Press, 2006) 
Shuck (novel, Arsenal Pulp Press, 2008) 
Krakow Melt (novel, Arsenal Pulp Press, 2010) 
Basement of Wolves (novel, Arsenal Pulp Press, 2012) 
Mouthquake (novel, Arsenal Pulp Press, 2015) 
I Felt the End Before It Came: Memoirs of a Queer Ex-Jehovah's Witness (essays, Penguin Random House Canada, forthcoming 2023)

References

External links
danielallencox.net

1976 births
Canadian male novelists
Canadian gay writers
Living people
Writers from Montreal
Canadian LGBT screenwriters
Former Jehovah's Witnesses
21st-century Canadian novelists
Canadian LGBT novelists
Canadian male screenwriters
21st-century Canadian male writers
21st-century Canadian screenwriters
21st-century Canadian LGBT people
Gay screenwriters
Gay novelists